Sun Sheng Xi (born 13 November 1990), also known as Shi Shi, is a Taiwanese-South Korean singer, songwriter and record producer.

In 2019, Sun won the Golden Melody Award for Best Mandarin Album for her fourth studio album, Shi's Journey. It was also her first win at the music awards.

Life and career
Sun participated in season 2 of Chinese Million Star, and finished in 6th place. In 2015, she was nominated for Best New Artist at the 26th Golden Melody Awards.

Discography

Studio albums

Singles

Filmography

Television series

Film

Awards and nominations

References

External links
 

1990 births
Living people
21st-century Taiwanese singers
Taiwanese singer-songwriters
Taiwanese Mandopop singers
People from Gangneung
Korean-language singers of Taiwan
Taiwanese people of Korean descent
Taiwanese expatriates in South Korea
21st-century Taiwanese women singers
Yonsei University alumni